Thathai Bhatia cuisine is the cuisine of a subset of the Bhatia people of India, who embraced the Bhakti sect of Hinduism while living in the Thatta region, and became Pushtimarg  – strict vegetarians who eschewed even onions and garlic and devoted themselves to Srinathji, the child form of Shri Krishna.

Thatta was mostly a desert region, hot and humid. In pre-modern times, the cooking process was very slow, using mostly charcoal or wood. The Thathai Bhatias devised different ways to simplify the cooking process, such as gently cooking fresh vegetables and lentils with minimal spices to keep the flavour of the food intact. They omitted the use of pungent flavours, that of onion and garlic, which require cooking for a longer duration. They also avoided the use of these strongly flavoured ingredients because any food they prepared was first offered to the gods – an act which the Bhatias call Bhog Dharanu. Use of onion or garlic was considered to render the food tamasic ("impure"), hence these were not used.

Bhog Dharanu is a ritual still followed in a lot of Bhatia households today, where the food prepared is first offered to the gods – as a token of love and gratitude for the daily meal. The belief is that gods bless the food. The food offered is then taken away while snapping the fingers twice to signal that it is being distributed to the family members as Prasad.

Method
The cooking method adopted in Bhatia cooking is quite simple. The vegetables are cooked with few spices and the tempering or the base spice is either of asafoetida (hing) or cumin (jeera). These serve the purpose of what onion or garlic is to other cuisines. Asafoetida and cumin are primarily used due to their medicinal properties of aiding in digestion. Vegetables commonly cooked in Bhatia cuisine are the ones which were abundantly available in dry places like Rajasthan or Thatta. The use of vegetables like brinjal (eggplant, baingan), courgette (turia) and bittergourd (karela) is extensive in the Bhatia cuisine. The concept of garnishing is quite simple and is mostly restricted to finely chopped coriander leaves or a dash of lime in most of the preparations.

Bhatias are amongst the few communities who commence lunch with a rice preparation and follow it up with breads (rotis, phulkas, poori) etc. Most of the other communities in India start their meal with Breads and follow it up with rice. The sophistication of Thathai Bhatia cuisine lies in its simplicity.

The first ever book on the Thathai Bhatia cuisine was launched in 2002 titled 'Panja Khada' - A Culinary Journey into Thathai Bhatia cuisine. The title Panja Khada means Our Food in the Bhatia Boli (a dialect of the Sindhi language). It was authored by Deepa Chachara & Bharat Chachara and was released by the Consul General of India to Dubai, H.E. George Joseph at the Consulate General of India, Dubai, U.A.E.

See also

Sindhi cuisine

References

 Dubai Authors Bite into a Niche Market. Business24-7.ae, 30 June 2010 by Deepa & Bharat Chachara
 Weekend. Khaleej Times, July 2010 by Deepa & Bharat Chachara
 Food Network . The National Newspaper, Abu Dhabi, August 11, 2010
 United flavors of Sindh . The Express Newspaper, Dubai, September 16, 2010

External links
 Panjakhada.com

Indian cuisine by culture
Indian cuisine by region
Sindhi cuisine